Salts Mill (sometimes spelled Salt's Mill) is a former textile mill, now an art gallery, shopping centre, and restaurant complex in Saltaire, Bradford, West Yorkshire, England.  It was built by Sir Titus Salt in 1853, and the present-day 1853 Gallery takes its name from the date of the building which houses it. The mill has many paintings by the local artist David Hockney on display and also provides offices for Pace plc.

The Mill and surrounding town of Saltaire was financed and built by the 19th century industrialist and philanthropist Sir Titus Salt after he observed other textile factories and was disappointed by the working conditions he saw there. At the time mill working conditions were commonly poor, with most workers suffering disease, low wages and labour exploitation. Dangerous machinery and long hours, sometimes exceeding 16 hour working days, resulted in frequent accidents. Titus Salt acknowledged this and built a factory and surrounding town with which he intended to improve the working conditions for his employees. When completed, the mill was the largest industrial building in the world by total floor area.  It is a grade II* listed building.  The mill closed in 1986 and the following year it was sold to Jonathan Silver, who began a long renovation scheme.

Spelling

The spellings Salts Mill and Salt's Mill (that is, with and without an apostrophe) are both commonly used. The former is used consistently by the Salts Mill website and the Saltaire Village website; the latter by Visit Bradford from the official Bradford Tourist Information service. Both versions are used in the UNESCO World Heritage documentation.

See also
Grade II* listed buildings in Bradford
Listed buildings in Saltaire
Bliss Tweed Mill
Lister Mills
 The Trackers of Oxyrhynchus

References

External links 

 Salts Mill Official web site.
 UNESCO World Heritage Centre
 
 
 

 http://www.saltaire.org.uk/salts-mill
 http://roberts-park.org/saltaire-history-timeline-1858-1892/
 http://www.bbc.co.uk/legacies/work/england/bradford/article_1.shtml

Industrial buildings completed in 1853
Buildings and structures in the City of Bradford
Grade II* listed buildings in West Yorkshire
Tourist attractions in the City of Bradford
History of the textile industry
Art museums and galleries in West Yorkshire
Museums in West Yorkshire
Shipley, West Yorkshire
David Hockney